Otterington (also known as Ottrington, foaled 1809) was a British Thoroughbred racehorse best known for winning the classic St Leger Stakes in 1812. He was one of the least successful of classic winners, winning only one other race from sixteen starts between May 1812 and June 1815. His St Leger victory was the only one of his three-year-old season, and was achieved at odds of 50/1. He subsequently won one two-runner race in eight attempts in 1813 and after missing the whole of following season he was beaten in all four of his starts as a six-year-old. Otterington's fate after his retirement from racing is unknown.

Background
Otterington was a bay horse owned for the early part of his racing career by drove business owner and farmer,  Ralph Rob of Catton, Yorkshire. Golumpus was unraced, and until the time of Otterington's success, had mainly been used as a sire of hunters and coach-horses. Otterington's dam, an unnamed mare sired by Expectation, later produced a filly by Orville who became a successful broodmare, being the ancestor of the St Leger winner Blue Bonnet. During his first season, the colt's name was usually spelled Ottrington.

Racing career

1812: three-year-old season
Otterington was unraced as a two-year-old and began his racing career at York Racecourse on 27 May. He started 2/1 second favourite in a field of five for a sweepstakes over one and three quarter mileas and finished third to Mr Brandling's unnamed bay colt. In the following month, Otterington was sent to Newcastle Racecourse in Northumberland where he had two races on 24 June. He was beaten by Mr Baker's bay colt by Emperor in a two mile sweepstakes and then turned out again immediately for the Silver Cup, a race run in a series of two and a quarter mile heats, with the prize going to the first horse to win twice. He finished third to Lord Strathmore's chestnut colt by Remembrancer in the first heat, and was withdrawn from the second, in which Lord Strathmore's colt completed his victory.

Otterington did not run again until the St Leger at Doncaster Racecourse on 21 September, where he started a 50/1 outsider in a field of twenty-four colts and fillies. The Oaks winner Manuella was made 3/1 favourite ahead of Catton on 9/2. Early in the straight Ottrington, ridden by Robert Johnson, emerged to dispute the lead with Herrington and Lord Strathmore's brown colt by Remembrancer. The three colts engaged in a "very severe struggle" before Ottrington prevailed by half a head from the Strathmore colt, with Herrington a head away in third. It was the first of four St Leger wins for Johnson, who was described as a "remarkably bold and resolute" rider. After the race, Otterington's trainer W. Hesseltine turned down an offer of 1,600 guineas for the colt.

1813: four-year-old season
At York in May, Otterington began his four-year-old season by finishing sixth when favourite for a two mile sweepstakes and then ran fourth in the Constitution Stakes two days later. At Newcastle in June he defeated the filly Agnes Sorrel by half a head in a "fine race" for a four mile sweepstakes to record his only success of the season, and then finished second when favourite for a King's Plate over the same course on the following day. Two months later at York, Otterington finished second to Catton in another King's Plate.

Otterington's next appearance was at Pontefract Racecourse in September, when he was beaten by the five-year-old Epperston, his only opponent in a four mile sweepstakes. Later that month, Otterington returned to Doncaster for the St Leger meeting, where he ran twice without success on the opening day, finishing fourth in the Fitzwilliam Stakes and last of the three runners in a King's Plate.

1815: six-year-old season
Otterington missed the whole of the 1814 season before reappearing in the ownership of Mr Kirby as a six-year-old in 1815, when he was campaigned in the south of England. At Newmarket he finished second to Don Cossack in a King's Plate on 28 April and then finished unplaced when favourite for a ten furlong handicap race two weeks later. Otterington had passed into the ownership of Mr Skeet by the time of the Derby meeting at Epsom, where he was withdrawn after finishing second in the first heat of the Town Plate. Otterington ended his racing career at Ascot Racecourse on 6 June when he finished last of the five runners in a two and a half mile sweepstakes.

Stud career
Otterington was listed for sale in January 1816 due to his owner moving abroad. He does not appear in any of the annual lists of stallions published in The Sporting Calendar and has no foals registered in the General Stud Book. He may have died of natural causes or been euthanised after his last race, although it is also possible that, like his sire, he was used to breed non-Thoroughbred stock.

Pedigree

Otterington was inbred 4 × 4 to Eclipse, Herod and Highflyer, meaning that each of these stallions appears twice in the fourth generation of his pedigree.

References

1809 racehorse births
Racehorses bred in the United Kingdom
Racehorses trained in the United Kingdom
Thoroughbred family 20
St Leger winners